Erik Kjellström (18 December 1904 – 7 November 1956) was a Swedish hurdler. He competed in the men's 110 metres hurdles at the 1928 Summer Olympics.

References

1904 births
1956 deaths
Athletes (track and field) at the 1928 Summer Olympics
Swedish male hurdlers
Olympic athletes of Sweden
Place of birth missing